Langar may refer to:

Community eating
Langar (Sikhism)
Langar (Sufism)

Places

Afghanistan 
Langar, Badakhshan, Afghanistan
Langar, Bamyan, Afghanistan
Langar, Faryab, Afghanistan
Langar, Herat, Afghanistan
Langar, Wardak, Afghanistan

Iran 
Langar, Kerman, Kerman Province
Langar, Rabor, Kerman Province
Langar-e Jadid, Khuzestan Province
Langar-e Qadim, Khuzestan Province
Langar, Kurdistan, Kurdistan Province
Langar, Mazandaran, Mazandaran Province
Langar, Bojnord, North Khorasan Province
Langar, Maneh and Samalqan, North Khorasan Province
Langar, Khoshab, Razavi Khorasan Province
Langar, Torbat-e Jam, Razavi Khorasan Province
Langar, Torqabeh and Shandiz, Razavi Khorasan Province
Langar, Sistan and Baluchestan, Sistan and Baluchestan Province

Pakistan 
 Langar, Punjab Pakistan

Tajikistan 
 Langar, Tajikistan

United Kingdom 
Langar, Nottinghamshire, a village in Nottinghamshire, England
RAF Langar, a former Royal Air Force base located near the village
British Parachute Schools, a parachuting drop zone which operates at the former RAF base

Uzbekistan 
Langar, Fergana Region, a village in Fergana Region